Barmer tehsil is a tehsil in Barmer District of Rajasthan state in western India. The tehsil headquarters is the city of Barmer.

Demographics
In the 2001 census, Barmer tehsil had 286,922 inhabitants, with 154,590 males (53.9%) and 132,332 females (46.1%), for a gender ratio of 856 females per thousand males.

Villages
There are fifty panchayat villages in Barmer tehsil.

Notes

Tehsils of Barmer district